Herbert von Karajan (born Heribert Ritter von Karajan; 5 April 1908 – 16 July 1989) was an Austrian conductor. He was principal conductor of the Berlin Philharmonic for 34 years. During the Nazi era, he debuted at the Salzburg Festival, with the Vienna Philharmonic, the Berlin Philharmonic, and during the Second World War he conducted at the Berlin State Opera.  Generally regarded as one of the greatest conductors of the 20th century, he was a controversial but dominant figure in European classical music from the mid-1950s until his death. Part of the reason for this was the large number of recordings he made and their prominence during his lifetime. By one estimate, he was the top-selling classical music recording artist of all time, having sold an estimated 200 million records.

Biography

Early life

Genealogy 

The Karajans were of Greek ancestry. Herbert's great-great-grandfather, Georg Karajan (Geórgios Karajánnis), was born in Kozani, in the Ottoman province of Rumelia (now in Greece), leaving for Vienna in 1767, and eventually Chemnitz, Electorate of Saxony.

His last name, like several other Ottoman-era ones, contains the Turkish language prefix "kara", which means "black".

He and his brother participated in the establishment of Saxony's cloth industry, and both were ennobled for their services by Frederick Augustus III on 1 June 1792, thus adding the prefix "von" to the family name. This usage disappeared with the abolition of Austrian nobility after World War I. The surname Karajánnis became Karajan. Although traditional biographers ascribed a Slovak and Serbian or simply a Slavic origin to his mother, Karajan's family from the maternal side, through his grandfather who was born in the village of Mojstrana, Duchy of Carniola (today in Slovenia), was Slovene. Aromanian heritage has also been claimed. Through the Slovene line, Karajan was related to the Slovenian-Austrian composer Hugo Wolf. He also seems to have known some Slovene.

Childhood and education 

Herbert Ritter von Karajan was born in Salzburg, Austria-Hungary, the second son of physician (surgeon) and senior consultant Ernst von Karajan (1868–1951) and Marta (née Martha Kosmač; 1881–1954) (married 1905). He was a child prodigy at the piano. From 1916 to 1926, he studied at the Mozarteum in Salzburg with Franz Ledwinka (piano), Franz Zauer (harmony), and Bernhard Paumgartner (composition and chamber music). 

He was encouraged to concentrate on conducting by Paumgartner, who detected his exceptional promise in that regard. In 1926 Karajan graduated from the conservatory and continued his studies at the Vienna Academy, studying piano with Josef Hofmann (a teacher with the same name as the pianist) and conducting with Alexander Wunderer and Franz Schalk.

Career

Early engagement 
Karajan made his debut as a conductor in Salzburg on 22 January 1929. The performance got the attention of the general manager of the Stadttheater in Ulm and led to Karajan's first appointment as assistant Kapellmeister of the theater. His senior colleague in Ulm was Otto Schulmann. After Schulmann was forced to leave Germany in 1933 with the NSDAP takeover, Karajan was promoted to first Kapellmeister.

Nazi years
In the postwar era, Karajan maintained silence about his Nazi Party membership, which gave rise to a number of conflicting stories about it. One version is that because of the changing political climate and the destabilization of his position, Karajan attempted to join the Nazi Party in Salzburg in April 1933, but his membership was later declared invalid because he somehow failed to follow up on the application and that Karajan formally joined the Nazi Party in Aachen in 1935, implying that he was not eager to pursue membership. More recent scholarship clears up this confusion: During the entire Nazi era he "never hesitated to open his concerts with the Nazi favorite 'Horst-Wessel-Lied', but "always maintained he joined strictly for career reasons." His enemies called him "SS Colonel von Karajan".

In 1933, Karajan made his conducting debut at the Salzburg Festival with the Walpurgisnacht Scene in Max Reinhardt's production of Faust. In Salzburg in 1934, Karajan led the Vienna Philharmonic for the first time, and from 1934 to 1941, he was engaged to conduct operatic and orchestra concerts at the Theater Aachen.

Karajan's career received a significant boost in 1935 when he became Germany's youngest Generalmusikdirektor, at Aachen, and performed as a guest conductor in Bucharest, Brussels, Stockholm, Amsterdam and Paris. In 1938 Karajan made his debut with the Berlin Philharmonic. The same year, he made his debut with the Berlin State Opera conducting Fidelio, and then had a major success at the State Opera with Tristan und Isolde. The critic wrote that Karajan's "success with Wagner's demanding work Tristan und Isolde sets himself alongside Wilhelm Furtwängler and Victor de Sabata, the greatest opera conductors in Germany at the present time". Receiving a contract with Deutsche Grammophon that same year, Karajan made the first of numerous recordings, conducting the Staatskapelle Berlin in the overture to The Magic Flute.

World War II 

Karajan's career continued to thrive at the beginning of the war. In 1939, the Berlin State Opera appointed him State Kapellmeister and conductor of concerts by the Prussian State Orchestra. He then became music director of the Staatskapelle Berlin, with which he toured Rome with extraordinary success. The next year, his contract in Aachen was discontinued. His marriage to Anita Gütermann (with one Jewish grandparent) and the prosecution of his agent Rudolf Vedder also contributed to his temporary professional decline, leaving him few engagements beyond a limited season of concerts with the Staatskapelle.

By 1944, Karajan was, by his own account, losing favour with the Nazi leadership, but still conducted concerts in Berlin on 18 February 1945. A short time later, in the closing stages of the war, he and his wife fled Germany for Milan, relocating with the assistance of Victor de Sabata.

Karajan's increased prominence from 1933 to 1945 has led to speculation that he joined the Nazi Party solely to advance his career. Critics such as Jim Svejda have pointed out that other prominent conductors, such as Arturo Toscanini, Otto Klemperer, Erich Kleiber, and Fritz Busch, fled Germany or Italy at the time. Richard Osborne noted that among the many significant conductors who continued to work in Germany during the war years—Wilhelm Furtwängler, Carl Schuricht, Karl Böhm, Hans Knappertsbusch, Clemens Krauss and Karl Elmendorff—Karajan was one of the youngest and thus one of the least advanced in his career. He was allowed to conduct various orchestras and was free to travel, even to the Netherlands to conduct the Concertgebouw Orchestra and make recordings there in 1943. He conducted for an audience of 300 Nazi armaments officials at a conference convened by Albert Speer in Linz, Austria, on 24-25 June 1944. 

Karajan's denazification tribunal, held in Vienna on 15 March 1946, cleared him of illegal activity during the Nazi period. The Austrian denazification examining board discharged Karajan on 18 March 1946, and he resumed conducting shortly thereafter. Years later, former German Chancellor Helmut Schmidt said of Karajan's Nazi party membership card, "Karajan was obviously not a Nazi. He was a ".

Postwar years 
In 1946, Karajan gave his first postwar concert in Vienna with the Vienna Philharmonic, but was banned from further conducting by the Soviet occupation authorities because of his Nazi party membership. That summer he participated anonymously in the Salzburg Festival.

On 28 October 1947, Karajan gave his first public concert following the lifting of the conducting ban. With the Vienna Philharmonic and the Gesellschaft der Musikfreunde, he performed Johannes Brahms's A German Requiem for a gramophone production in Vienna.

In 1949, Karajan became artistic director of the Gesellschaft der Musikfreunde, Vienna. He also conducted at La Scala in Milan. His most prominent activity at this time was recording with the newly formed Philharmonia Orchestra in London, helping to build them into one of the world's finest. Starting from this year, Karajan began his lifelong attendance at the Lucerne Festival.

In 1951 and 1952, Karajan conducted at the Bayreuth Festspielhaus.

Berlin appointment
During its 1955 tour of the United States, Karajan's past membership in the Nazi Party led to the Berlin Philharmonic's concerts being banned in Detroit, and Philadelphia Orchestra music director Eugene Ormandy refused to shake Karajan's hand. Upon arriving in New York City for a concert at Carnegie Hall, Karajan and the Berlin Philharmonic were confronted by protests and picketers.

In 1956, Karajan was appointed principal conductor for life of the Berlin Philharmonic as Furtwängler's successor.

From 1957 to 1964, Karajan was artistic director of the Vienna State Opera. He was closely involved with the Vienna Philharmonic and the Salzburg Festival, where he initiated the Easter Festival, which remained tied to the Berlin Philharmonic's music director after his tenure.

Last years
In his later years, Karajan suffered from heart and back problems, needing surgery on the latter. He resigned as principal conductor of the Berlin Philharmonic on 24 April 1989. His last concert was Bruckner's 7th Symphony with the Vienna Philharmonic. He died of a heart attack at his home in Anif on 16 July 1989 at the age of 81.

Karajan read the works of Father Hugo Enomiya-Lassalle on Zen Buddhism and became a practitioner of it. He believed in reincarnation and said he would like to be reborn as an eagle so he could soar over his beloved Alps. Even so, on 29 June 1985, he conducted Wolfgang Amadeus Mozart's Coronation Mass during a Mass celebrated by John Paul II in St. Peter's Basilica, on the Feast of Sts. Peter and Paul, and received Holy Communion from the hand of the Pope with his wife and daughters. By the end of his life he had reconciled with the Catholic Church, and requested a Catholic burial.

Personal life

Marriages and children 

On 26 July 1938, Karajan married Elmy Holgerloef, an operetta singer. He first worked with her on a 1935 New Year's Eve gala production of Strauss's Die Fledermaus. They divorced in 1942. Elmy died of heart failure in 1983. A statement from his Salzburg office stated that Karajan was "very shocked, affected, and deeply upset by the news. He had never forgotten her; she had been a part of his life." Karajan did not attend her funeral in Aachen.

On 22 October 1942, at the height of the Second World War, Karajan married his second wife, Anna Maria "Anita" Sauest, born Gütermann, the daughter of a well-known manufacturer of yarn for sewing machines. Having had a Jewish grandfather, she was considered a Vierteljüdin (one-quarter Jewish woman). They divorced in 1958.

On 6 October 1958, Karajan married his third wife, Eliette Mouret, a French model born in Mollans-sur-Ouvèze. She had enjoyed a carefree childhood growing up in Provence before being discovered by Christian Dior when she was 18. This laid the foundation for an international modelling career. Karajan first met Mouret in 1957 and was deeply taken with her. Their first daughter, Isabel, was born on 25 June 1960. In 1964, their second daughter, Arabel, was born.

After Karajan's death, Eliette continued his musical legacy by founding of the Herbert von Karajan Centre in Vienna, now in Salzburg and known as the Eliette and Herbert von Karajan Institute. Her numerous projects focus particularly on the development of young people, and she is a patron of the Salzburg Easter Festival.

Hobbies 

Karajan was a passionate sportsman since he was a teenager. He was a keen skier and swimmer and followed a daily yoga ritual. He won several regattas aboard his racing yachts christened Helisara. He piloted his Learjet, and was a great sailing and car enthusiast, particularly fond of Porsches. He ordered a specially configured Type 930 with Martini & Rossi livery and his name on the back of the Porsche 911 Turbo.

Musicianship 
One of Karajan's signature skills as a conductor was his ability to extract exquisite sounds from orchestras. His biographer Roger Vaughan observed this phenomenon while listening to the Berlin Philharmonic play in 1986, after nearly 30 years under Karajan's direction, noting that "what rivets one's attention is the beauty and perfection of the sounds. The softest of pianissimos commands rapt attention. The smooth crescendos peak exactly when they should. The breaks are sliced clean, without the slightest ragged edge."

Conducting style 
Perhaps the most distinctive feature of Karajan's conducting style was his propensity to conduct with his eyes closed. This is highly unusual for a conductor, as eye contact is generally regarded as of paramount importance to the conductor's communication with the orchestra. Yet, as Vaughan remarked: "[h]ere is one of the fascinating aspects of conducting: there are no rules, only guidelines. The most eccentric approach is tolerated if the results are successful." Indeed, James Galway, who served as principal flutist of the Berlin Philharmonic from 1969 to 1975, recalled that "he [Karajan] achieved most of what he wanted through charm".

But there were reasons for many of Karajan's eccentricities. Conducting with his eyes closed, for instance, was a consequence of memorizing scores; keeping his eyes closed helped him keep focus. Karajan's method of score study, too, was somewhat unusual, as noted by his friend Walter Legge, who remarked:

 "He is one of the few conductors I have known who has never made a mark in a score. He will absorb a score quietly sitting on the floor, like a relaxed Siamese cat. Over the years he has learned how completely to relax the body so the mind is absolutely free to do what it wants."

Karajan was also known for his preternaturally keen sense of tempo, even going so far as to have himself tested against a computer to prove it. He insisted that this skill was learned, not inherited, and considered it the bedrock of musical interpretations. In fact, he cited inconsistencies in rhythmic accuracy and control as "one thing that might make me lose my temper. I can accept a wrong note from an orchestra but when everything is getting faster or slower, that I cannot accept."

He once explained to a German journalist why he preferred the Berlin to the Vienna Philharmonic: "If I tell the Berliners to step forward, they do it. If I tell the Viennese to step forward, they do it, but then they ask why."

Musical tastes 
Karajan was a noted interpreter of virtually every standard of the classical repertoire, from the Baroque era to the 20th century. He was an admirer of Glenn Gould's interpretations of Bach, performing the D minor Keyboard Concerto with him on one occasion. The eminent Haydn scholar H. C. Robbins Landon considered Karajan's recordings of the 12 London Symphonies as some of the finest he knew, and his multiple Beethoven cycles are still staples.

Yet Karajan's real interests seem to have lain in the period from the late 19th to the mid-20th centuries. Principal among these were his fascinations with the composers Anton Bruckner and Jean Sibelius. In a 1981 interview with Gramophones Robert Layton, Karajan remarked that he felt "a much deeper influence, affinity, kinship—call it what you like—[in Sibelius's music] with Bruckner. There is this sense of the Urwald, the primaeval forest, the feeling of elemental power, that one is dealing with something profound." When pressed about this connection toward the end of his life by his biographer Osborne, Karajan echoed some of these sentiments, saying:

 There is in both [Bruckner and Sibelius] a sense of the elemental. But I have often asked myself what it is that drew me to Sibelius's music and I think it is that he is a composer who cannot really be compared to anyone else. ... And you never come to an end with him. I think it is perhaps also to do with my love of remote places, my love of mountains rather than cities.

Layton demystifies this relationship somewhat by observing that:

 [s]tring tremolandi and pedal points are, of course, among [the similarities between Bruckner and Sibelius], and we hear Brucknerian echoes in the development section of the first movement of Kullervo, written only a year or so after Sibelius first heard Bruckner's Third Symphony in Vienna.

Yet the most potent assessment of Karajan's interpretation of Sibelius's music came from Sibelius himself, who, according to Legge, said, "Karajan is the only conductor who plays what I meant."

Karajan was also a prolific opera conductor, championing the works of Wagner, Verdi, Richard Strauss and Puccini. Verdi's last opera, Falstaff, was something of a mainstay throughout Karajan's career. In his conversations with Osborne, Karajan recalled that, in the 1930s, when Italian opera was still something of a rarity in Austria and Germany:

 [M]y training in Verdi's Falstaff came from Toscanini. There wasn't a rehearsal in either Vienna or Salzburg at which I wasn't present. I think I heard about thirty. From Toscanini I learnt the phrasing and the words—always with Italian singers, which was unheard of in Germany then. I don't think I ever opened the score. It was so in my ears, I just knew it.

Karajan went on to make two recordings of it—one for EMI in 1956 and another for Philips in 1980—and his colleague Otto Klemperer hailed the Vienna State Opera production as "really excellent". Strauss was likewise a continual force in Karajan's life, not just as a composer, but as a conductor. Karajan recounted their only "proper" meeting, in 1939, to Osborne:

 [A]t the end [of a performance of Elektra in Berlin] he came and said to me it was the best performance of the opera he had ever heard. I said, "I don't really want to hear this; tell me what was wrong with it." I think he was surprised by my reaction, so he asked me to lunch the next day. He said, "You have made the music very clear, the fp here, the accent there; but these are not at all important. Just wave your stick around a bit!" He made a gesture like stirring a pudding. But what he meant was, let the music flow more naturally.

Use of recording technology 
Karajan conducted and recorded prolifically, mainly with the Berlin Philharmonic and the Vienna Philharmonic. He conducted other orchestras (including the NHK Symphony Orchestra, the New York Philharmonic, the Concertgebouw Orchestra, the Orchestre de Paris, the Orchestra of Teatro alla Scala, Milan and the Staatskapelle Dresden), but the vast majority of his recordings were made with the Berlin and Vienna orchestras. He also left a considerable legacy of recordings with the Philharmonia Orchestra, his last performance being in 1960.

Although he made recordings with several labels, notably EMI, it is Deutsche Grammophon with which he became most associated, making 330 recordings with it. Karajan's 1981 Deutsche Grammophon recording of An Alpine Symphony with the Berlin Philharmonic became the first work ever to be pressed on the compact disc format. Even though his repertoire had been extensively covered in analog (LP record), he spent the rest of the 1980s making digital recordings, notably rerecording Beethoven's symphonies (Karajan and the Berlin Philharmonic's 1977 analog recording of Beethoven's Symphony No. 3 won the Grand Prix du Disque, while their 1984 digital recording of it was not particularly critically acclaimed yet sold considerably more). In the mid-1990s, Deutsche Grammophon released the Karajan Gold series, remixes of Karajan's 1980s digital recordings enhanced by 24-bit processing.

Karajan filmed performances of his work for both Unitel and his own company, Telemondial.

Critical reception 
The so-called Karajan sound remains something of a litmus test for critics, dividing them into two competing camps. Two reviews from the Penguin Guide to Compact Discs illustrate this point:

 Of a 1971–72 studio recording of Tristan und Isolde, the Penguin authors wrote, "Karajan's is a sensual performance of Wagner's masterpiece, caressingly beautiful and with superbly refined playing from the Berlin Philharmonic".
 Of Karajan's recording of Haydn's "Paris" symphonies, the same authors wrote, "big-band Haydn with a vengeance ... It goes without saying that the quality of the orchestral playing is superb. However, these are heavy-handed accounts, closer to Imperial Berlin than to Paris ... the Minuets are very slow indeed ... These performances are too charmless and wanting in grace to be whole-heartedly recommended."

The New York Times writer John Rockwell wrote in 1989: "He had a particular gift for Wagner and above all for Bruckner, whose music he conducted with sovereign command and elevated feeling."

Legacy 
Karajan's concerts came to be considered major cultural events. In a 1982 tour of the United States, musical stars from Zubin Mehta and Seiji Ozawa to Frank Sinatra attended his Carnegie Hall concerts. Karajan was less interested in publicity or legacy than in building the cultural institution of music. "When I am on the podium, I forget all about the public," he said. "I am not interested in publicity. I can only hope there is an advantage to my being known in the world, that through the interest people take in me, they will then move on to an interest in music."

Much of Karajan's legacy is inextricable from his pioneering attitude toward recording technology. He made over 800 recordings, far surpassing the output of other contemporary conductors. Deutsche Grammophon said his albums sold ''probably hundreds of millions'' of copies. The West German newsweekly Der Spiegel reported that he earned more than $6 million annually from record sales and conducting fees in 1989. Karajan amassed a fortune valued at 250 million euros as of 2008, remaining one of top-selling classical music artists two decades after his death.

Notable students 
Despite Karajan's significant prowess as a conductor, he was more often seen behind the camera than in the teaching studio, preferring to record rehearsals rather than give masterclasses. He maintained a long friendship with Ozawa, whose success makes him Karajan's most outstanding student. Indeed, Ozawa was reportedly a strong contender to succeed Karajan at the Berlin Philharmonic; Karajan called him the "conductor with the best character" for the position.

Awards and honours 
Karajan was the recipient of multiple honours and awards. He became a Grand Officer of the Order of Merit of the Italian Republic on 17 May 1960, and in 1961 received the Austrian Medal for Science and Art. He also received the Grand Merit Cross (Grosses Bundesverdienstkreuz) of the Order of Merit of the Federal Republic of Germany.

In 1977, Karajan was awarded the Ernst von Siemens Music Prize. On 21 June 1978 he received an honorary doctorate from Oxford University. He received two Gramophone Awards for recordings of Mahler's Ninth Symphony and the complete Parsifal recordings in 1981. He received the Eduard Rhein Ring of Honor from the German Eduard Rhein Foundation in 1984. He was voted into the inaugural Gramophone Hall of Fame in 2012. He received the Picasso Medal from UNESCO.

From 2003 to 2015, the Festspielhaus Baden-Baden awarded the annual Herbert von Karajan Music Prize in recognition of excellence in musical achievements. In 2003 Anne-Sophie Mutter, who had made her debut with Karajan in 1977, became the award's first recipient. In 2015 the award was replaced by the Herbert von Karajan Prize, presented at the Salzburg Easter Festival.

Karajan was an honorary citizen of Salzburg (1968), Berlin (1973), and Vienna (1978). Since 2005 his legacy has been managed by the Eliette and Herbert von Karajan Institute.

Grammy Awards 
Karajan's multiple Grammy Awards make him a particularly prominent conductor historically; he received 40 Grammy nominations across nearly 30 years. He was a three-time Grammy Award recipient, winning Best Opera Recording award for Bizet's Carmen in 1964 and Wagner's Siegfried in 1969 and Best Classical Orchestral Performance for a Beethoven symphony cycle in 1978. Karajan's Beethoven cycles remain some of the most popular and enduring worldwide, as well as the most critically acclaimed recordings of the past century.

Monuments 
Karajan has remained a visible part of everyday life in the cities he once called home, thanks in part to monuments erected in his honour. In Salzburg, for instance, the Karajan Foundation of Vienna commissioned the Czech artist Anna Chromý to create a life-sized statue of him, which now stands outside his birthplace.

In 1983, a bronze bust of Karajan was unveiled in the foyer of Berlin's new State Theatre.

In popular culture 
Two of Karajan's interpretations were popularized through their inclusion in the soundtrack of the film 2001: A Space Odyssey. Most famously, the version of Johann Strauss's The Blue Danube heard during the film's early outer space scenes is that of Karajan with the Berlin Philharmonic. The version of Richard Strauss's Also sprach Zarathustra used in the film is that of Karajan with the Vienna Philharmonic.

Selected discography 
Signing a contract with Deutsche Grammophon in 1938, Karajan was noted for his studious perfectionism in his symphonic recordings, as well as numerous opera recordings by Verdi and Puccini, in particular those with Maria Callas. Other Karajan recordings with the Berlin Philharmonic include Also sprach Zarathustra, Der Ring des Nibelungen, and Mahler's Symphony No. 5.

During Karajan's lifetime, the public associated him with the works of Beethoven. Karajan recorded four complete Beethoven symphony cycles, first with the Philharmonia Orchestra for Angel in 1951 to 1955, and then three times with the Berlin Philharmonic Orchestra for Deutsche Grammophon in 1961–62, 1975–76, and 1982–84.

Among 20th-century musical works, Karajan had a preference for conducting and recording works from the first half of the century, by such composers as Mahler, Schoenberg, Berg, Webern, Bartók, Sibelius, Richard Strauss, Puccini, Honegger, Prokofiev, Debussy, Ravel, Hindemith, Nielsen, Stravinsky and Holst. Performances of works written after 1950 included Shostakovich's Tenth Symphony (1953), which he performed many times and recorded twice. He and Shostakovich met during a tour with the Berlin Philharmonic culminating in Moscow in May 1969. 

Karajan said in a 1983 interview with the German TV channel ZDF that if he had been a composer instead of conductor, his music would have been similar to Shostakovich's. Karajan conducted the Berlin Philharmonic in Hans Werner Henze's Sonata per Archi (1958) and Antifone (1960). In 1960 he performed Ildebrando Pizzetti's 1958 opera Assassinio nella cattedrale. Karajan premiered Carl Orff's De temporum fine comoedia in 1973 with the Cologne Radio Symphony Orchestra and recorded it for Deutsche Grammophon.

See also
 Gottbegnadeten list
 Debussy: Pelléas et Mélisande (Herbert von Karajan recording)
 Mozart: Le nozze di Figaro (Herbert von Karajan recording)

Notes

References

Bibliography

Further reading
 Mischa Aster, "Das Reichsorchester", Die Berliner Philharmoniker und der Nationalsozialismus. Siedler Verlag, 2007, .

External links 

 
 František Sláma: Part2 : Herbert von Karajan – Conductors and a few more recollections besides
 Elaine Madlener Papers: correspondence and notes for an unfinished Karajan biography  at Newberry Library
 , ZDF, in German without subtitles

 
1908 births
1989 deaths
20th-century Austrian conductors (music)
20th-century Austrian male musicians
Male conductors (music)
Austrian Nazis
Austrian knights
Austrian people of Greek descent
Austrian people of Slovenian descent
Austrian Roman Catholics
Commanders Crosses of the Order of Merit of the Federal Republic of Germany
Deutsche Grammophon artists
Ernst von Siemens Music Prize winners
General Directors of the Vienna State Opera
Grammy Award winners
Grand Officers of the Order of Merit of the Italian Republic
Academic staff of Lausanne Conservatory
Mozarteum University Salzburg alumni
Music directors (opera)
Music directors of the Berlin State Opera
Music directors of the Vienna State Opera
Nobility in the Nazi Party
Opera managers
Musicians from Salzburg
Recipients of the Austrian Decoration for Science and Art
Royal Philharmonic Society Gold Medallists
Salzburg Festival directors
University of Music and Performing Arts Vienna alumni